Eupithecia mesogrammata is a moth in the family Geometridae. It is found in Iran, Turkey and Georgia.

References

Moths described in 1910
mesogrammata
Moths of Europe
Moths of Asia